Brandreth may refer to:

 Brandreth, a fell in the English Lake District
 Brandreth (archaic), a 3 or 4 legged stand designed to hold  a cauldron over an open flame
 Brandreth (surname)
 Brandreth Park, a  private preserve in the Adirondacks established in 1851 by Dr. Benjamin Brandreth
 Brandreth Pill Factory, a historic industrial complex located on Water Street in Ossining, New York, United States